In mathematics, Diophantine geometry is the study of Diophantine equations by means of powerful methods in algebraic geometry. By the 20th century it became clear for some mathematicians that methods of algebraic geometry are ideal tools to study these equations. Diophantine geometry is part of the broader field of arithmetic geometry.

Four theorems in Diophantine geometry which are of fundamental importance include:

 Mordell–Weil theorem
 Roth's theorem
 Siegel's theorem
 Faltings's theorem

Background
Serge Lang published a book Diophantine Geometry in the area in 1962, and by this book he coined the term "Diophantine Geometry". The traditional arrangement of material on Diophantine equations was by degree and number of variables, as in Mordell's Diophantine Equations (1969). Mordell's book starts with a remark on homogeneous equations f = 0 over the rational field, attributed to C. F. Gauss, that non-zero solutions in integers (even primitive lattice points) exist if non-zero rational solutions do, and notes a caveat of L. E. Dickson, which is about parametric solutions. The Hilbert–Hurwitz result from 1890 reducing the Diophantine geometry of curves of genus 0 to degrees 1 and 2 (conic sections) occurs in Chapter 17, as does Mordell's conjecture. Siegel's theorem on integral points occurs in Chapter 28. Mordell's theorem on the finite generation of the group of rational points on an elliptic curve is in Chapter 16, and integer points on the Mordell curve in Chapter 26.

In a hostile review of Lang's book, Mordell wrote:

He notes that the content of the book is largely versions of the Mordell–Weil theorem, Thue–Siegel–Roth theorem, Siegel's theorem, with a treatment of Hilbert's irreducibility theorem and applications (in the style of Siegel). Leaving aside issues of generality, and a completely different style, the major mathematical difference between the two books is that Lang used abelian varieties and offered a proof of Siegel's theorem, while Mordell noted that the proof "is of a very advanced character" (p. 263).

Despite a bad press initially, Lang's conception has been sufficiently widely accepted for a 2006 tribute to call the book "visionary". A larger field sometimes called arithmetic of abelian varieties now includes Diophantine geometry along with class field theory, complex multiplication, local zeta-functions and L-functions. Paul Vojta wrote:

While others at the time shared this viewpoint (e.g., Weil, Tate, Serre), it is easy to forget that others did not, as Mordell's review of Diophantine Geometry attests.

Approaches
A single equation defines a hypersurface, and simultaneous Diophantine equations give rise to a general algebraic variety V over K; the typical question is about the nature of the set V(K) of points on V with co-ordinates in K, and by means of height functions quantitative questions about the "size" of these solutions may be posed, as well as the qualitative issues of whether any points exist, and if so whether there are an infinite number. Given the geometric approach, the consideration of homogeneous equations and homogeneous co-ordinates is fundamental, for the same reasons that projective geometry is the dominant approach in algebraic geometry. Rational number solutions therefore are the primary consideration; but integral solutions (i.e. lattice points) can be treated in the same way as an affine variety may be considered inside a projective variety that has extra points at infinity.

The general approach of Diophantine geometry is illustrated by Faltings's theorem (a conjecture of L. J. Mordell) stating that an algebraic curve C of genus g > 1 over the rational numbers has only finitely many rational points. The first result of this kind may have been the theorem of Hilbert and Hurwitz dealing with the case g = 0. The theory consists both of theorems and many conjectures and open questions.

See also
 Glossary of arithmetic and Diophantine geometry
 Arakelov geometry

Citations

References

External links
Lang's review of Mordell's Diophantine Equations
Mordell's review of Lang's Diophantine Geometry

 
Fields of mathematics